The Southern African Underwater and Hyperbaric Medical Association (SAUHMA) is an organisation of voluntary members with a special interest in the subject of underwater and/or hyperbaric medicine, recognised by the Council of the South African Medical Association as a special interest group. The Association promotes the practice and facilitates the study of underwater and hyperbaric medicine. Membership includes members and associate members, and may include medical practitioners; registered nurses; registered paramedics; qualified hyperbaric chamber operators; diving instructors; dive operators, and any other person with a special interest underwater or hyperbaric medicine.

History
SAUHMA was formed in 1992, and affiliated to the Undersea and Hyperbaric Medical Society (UHMS) in 1994. It follows the UHMS safety and medical recommendations and supports the UHMS HBO Committee's list of indications.

Diving medical registry
SAUHMA is the accreditation agency for facilities for hyperbaric medicine in South Africa, and for the personnel operating such facilities.

It is also the designated agency to provide the national on-line database of all registered designated medical practitioners licensed to perform medical examinations of fitness to dive for commercial divers in South Africa, and of the results of all medical examinations for fitness to dive for commercial divers in terms of Regulations 19 and 20 of the Diving Regulations 2009 to the South African Occupational Health and Safety Act No. 85 of 1993.

References

Diving medicine organizations